Black Market Militia is the first album by the hip hop supergroup Black Market Militia. It was released on March 22, 2005, through Nature Sounds. The album has sold 5,727 copies.

Track listing 
"Intro: Children of Children"
"Thug Nation"
"May Day!"
"Audobon Ballroom" (featuring Dead Prez)
"The Struggle"
"Hood Lullabye"
"Gem Star's"
"Righteous Talk"
"The Final Call"
"Dead Street Scrolls"
"Paintbrush"
"Black Market"
"The Breath of Life"
"Think Market"

References

2005 albums
Killah Priest albums
Hell Razah albums
Tragedy Khadafi albums
Albums produced by Ron Browz
Nature Sounds albums
Albums produced by Bronze Nazareth